Fast Color is a 2018 American superhero drama film directed by Julia Hart from a screenplay by Hart and Jordan Horowitz. Horowitz produced the film along with Mickey Lidell and Pete Shilaimon. It stars Gugu Mbatha-Raw, Lorraine Toussaint, Saniyya Sidney, Christopher Denham and David Strathairn, and tells the story of Ruth (Mbatha-Raw), a woman with supernatural powers on the run from law enforcement and scientists who want to study and control her.

The project was announced in January 2017, along with Mbatha-Raw's casting and that LD Entertainment would be fully financing the project. Principal photography began on March 13, 2017 in New Mexico and lasted for 28 days.

The film had its world premiere at South by Southwest on March 10, 2018. It was released on April 19, 2019, by Lionsgate and Codeblack Films. The film received positive reviews from critics with praise directed at Mbatha-Raw's performance and its uniqueness compared to other superhero films, but with criticism aimed at the script.

A television series based on the film is in development at Amazon Studios, with Viola Davis' JuVee Productions producing, and with the film's original writers returning to script the show.

Plot
In the future American Midwest, where it has not rained for eight years, Ruth is a homeless wanderer whose seizures trigger supernatural earthquakes. As she travels to her old family home, she meets Bill, a diner customer who is actually a scientist attempting to capture Ruth for study. Bill tricks her into accepting a ride with him then attempts to draw blood samples from her, but Ruth wounds him and flees in the direction of her home. Bill is forced to abandon his vehicle to seek medical aid, where it catches the attention of the local sheriff Ellis.

Arriving at the home, Ruth reunites with her mother Bo, who has the ability to telekinetically disintegrate objects, reassemble them, and see vibrant flashes known as "the colors". Lila mentions it's also like an after effect. Bo has been taking care of Ruth's daughter Lila, who has the same powers as Bo and has no memories of her mother. After Ruth accidentally sets off another earthquake, Lila is introduced to her and they explain that Ruth's powers deteriorated in her childhood, becoming destructive and causing her to abandon her family.

Lila and Bo attempt to train Ruth on reconnecting with her old powers, while the scientist and the sheriff investigate Ruth's trail. When Ellis discerns Ruth is back home, he covertly signals Bo, his longtime friend and lover, to warn her about the scientist that is searching for their daughter. The next morning, Bill begins heading for the women's house, and Ruth takes off in the family truck to escape him, leaving Bo and Lila behind. When she exits miles later for gasoline, her seizures return. Ruth relives the memory of her nearly drowning her then-infant daughter during a past episode, and then of saving her life, emotionally healing and causing the sky to rain again.

Ruth returns home, where Ellis informs her that Bill and his accomplices kidnapped Lila. Ruth goes to rescue her, followed by Ellis and Bo. At the sheriff's office where Lila is being held, Ruth creates a storm and panics Bill and his guards. Bo offers herself to the scientists in exchange for Lila, who is reunited with her mother. The two escape in the truck, and find a note from Bo telling them to head for Rome to find another woman that she used to know with powers.

Cast
 Gugu Mbatha-Raw as Ruth
 Aliza Halm as young Ruth
 Lorraine Toussaint as Bo
 Saniyya Sidney as Lila, Ruth's daughter
 Christopher Denham as Bill
 David Strathairn as Ellis
 Levi Lobo as Henry

Production
In January 2017, it was announced Gugu Mbatha-Raw had joined the cast of the film, with Julia Hart directing, from a screenplay written by Hart and Jordan Horowitz. Horowitz, Mickey Liddell and Pete Shilaimon will produce under their Original Headquarters and LD Entertainment banners, respectively. In March 2017, Lorraine Toussaint, David Strathairn, Saniyya Sidney, and Christopher Denham joined the cast of the film.

Filming
Principal photography began in New Mexico on March 13, 2017 and lasted for 28 days.

Release
The film had its world premiere at South by Southwest on March 10, 2018. Shortly after, Codeblack Films acquired distribution rights to the film and set it for a March 29, 2019, release. It was then pushed back to April 19, 2019, with Lionsgate now distributing the film from Codeblack Films.

Critical reception
The website's critic consensus states: "A grounded superhero story with more on its mind than punching bad guys, Fast Color leaps over uneven execution with a single Gugu Mbatha-Raw performance." On Metacritic the film has a weighted average score of 64% based on reviews from 20 critics, indicating "generally favorable reviews".

Richard Roeper of the Chicago Sun-Times gave the film 3.5 stars and praised Mbatha-Raw for her performance, and director Julia Hart for "genuinely moving drama, an engrossing, supernatural-sci-fi mystery and some pretty darn impressive special effects."
Sheri Linden of The Hollywood Reporter wrote: "Hart has fashioned a tale of matriarchal inheritance, but one whose fierce message is undercut rather than deepened by its child's-book clarity. The intriguing setup receives underpowered execution, the intended jolts landing all too softly."
Amy Nicholson of Variety wrote: "Ultimately, Fast Color’s thesis is more inspirational than the film, which often seems like it, too, is struggling to swirl itself into something more solid. Instead, its magical sparks don’t quite congeal as the audience can’t help hoping a movie this empathetic and unusual reaches transcendence".

Television series
As of 2019, a TV series based on the film was in development at Amazon Studios. The show is set to be produced by Viola Davis and Julius Tennon's company JuVee Productions, with the return of the film's writers Julia Hart and Jordan Horowitz. However, as of January 2022, no further information about a forthcoming series has materialized.

See also
 List of black films of the 2010s
 Afrofuturism in film

References

External links
 
 

2018 films
2010s science fiction films
2010s superhero films
2010s supernatural films
American superhero films
American science fiction thriller films
American thriller drama films
American independent films
2018 independent films
American dystopian films
2010s English-language films
Films about families
Films directed by Julia Hart
Films scored by Rob Simonsen
Films set in the future
Films set in the United States
Films shot in New Mexico
LD Entertainment films
Climate change films
2010s American films